Serrano Futebol Clube is a Brazilian football soccer club, founded in 1983, from Serra Talhada, Pernambuco.

Honours

 Pernambuco Championship 2nd level runner-up: 2003
 Campeonato do Interior: 2005

Appearances in competitions

 Campeonato Pernambucano: 2004 to 2008
 Campeonato Brasileiro Série C: 2005

Website
https://web.archive.org/web/20080203110454/http://www.serranope.com.br/

Association football clubs established in 1983
Football clubs in Pernambuco
1983 establishments in Brazil